Rote Teufel Bad Nauheim, also known as EC Bad Nauheim, is an ice hockey team in Bad Nauheim, Germany. They currently play in DEL2, the second level of ice hockey in Germany. Prior to the 2013–14 season they played in the Oberliga. The club was founded in 1946 as VfL Bad Nauheim.

Achievements
Oberliga champion : 1984, 2013.
1. Liga North runner-up: 1998.
2. Bundesliga runner-up: 1999.

References

External links
  ec-bn.de - EC Bad Nauheim official website

Ice hockey teams in Germany
Ice hockey clubs established in 1982
1982 establishments in West Germany
Wetteraukreis